Balyayla is a village in the Tercan District, Erzincan Province, Turkey. The village is populated by Kurds of the Balaban tribe and had a population of 61 in 2021.

The hamlet of Balöz is attached to the village.

References 

Villages in Tercan District
Kurdish settlements in Erzincan Province